Pteracantha fasciata is a species of beetle in the family Cerambycidae. It was described by Newman in 1838.

References

Trachyderini
Beetles described in 1838